Jagonews24.com is an online Bengali language news portal in Bangladesh. Launched on 10 May 2014, the portal is owned by AKC Private Limited. As of July 2021, Alexa ranked the website 1,603 worldwide and 8th in Bangladesh which is the 13th among the news-related websites in Bangladesh.

History
Jagonews24.com officially launched on 10 May 2014 with the slogan Home of online objective news. K M Zeaul Haque is serving as its acting Editor. The portal has started the publication of printed Eid Edition in 2015. In the same year, it has launched an online campaign to recognize Bengali as one of the Official languages of the United Nations.

References

External links 
  (BN)
  (EN)

2014 establishments in Bangladesh
Bangladeshi news websites
Bengali-language newspapers published in Bangladesh